Milić Starovlah (born 28 January 1998) is a Montenegrin professional basketball player, who most recently played for Szedeák of the Nemzeti Bajnokság I/A, the top division in Hungary. After a brief spell developing at the Torrejón Basketball Academy in Spain, Starovlah finished his basketball upbringing in the Balkans,  where he was a member of the Montenegro national basketball youth team.

References

1998 births
Living people
ABA League players
KK Budućnost players
KK Lovćen players
KK Studentski centar players
Montenegrin men's basketball players
Shooting guards